The Tomba della Mula (Italian: "Tomb of the She-Mule") is a beehive tomb in Sesto Fiorentino, near Florence, Central Italy, dating to the 7th century BC.

The name derives from an ancient legend, according to which a golden she-mule had been buried in the fields around Florence. It is known since the 15th century, and is the largest pre-Roman Italic dome tomb known in Italy.

The tomb was declared a national monument in 1905.

External links
Page at Scientific Itineraries in Tuscany website 

Buildings and structures completed in the 7th century BC
15th-century archaeological discoveries
Etruscan tombs
Buildings and structures in Tuscany
Burial monuments and structures
Burials in Italy
Archaeological sites in Tuscany
Beehive tombs